The Deportees' Cross 1914–1918 was a Belgian war medal established on 27 November 1922 by royal decree and awarded to Belgian citizens deported to Germany for forced labour during the First World War.

Deportees who died during their deportation were not awarded this cross, instead, they received the Order of Leopold II with the ribbon bearing a central longitudinal gold stripe.

Award description
The Deportees' Cross 1914–1918 is a 38mm wide bronze cross pattée with identical obverse and reverse.  The horizontal arms bear the relief inscription "1914" on the right arm and "1918" on the left arm.

The cross is suspended by a ring through a suspension loop from a 37mm wide dark red silk moiré ribbon adorned with 3mm chevrons in the national colours of Belgium.

See also

 List of Orders, Decorations and Medals of the Kingdom of Belgium

References
Royal decree of 27 November 1922

Other sources
 Quinot H., 1950, Recueil illustré des décorations belges et congolaises, 4e Edition. (Hasselt)
 Cornet R., 1982, Recueil des dispositions légales et réglementaires régissant les ordres nationaux belges. 2e Ed. N.pl.,  (Brussels)
 Borné A.C., 1985, Distinctions honorifiques de la Belgique, 1830–1985 (Brussels)

External links
Bibliothèque royale de Belgique (In French)
Les Ordres Nationaux Belges (In French)

Orders, decorations, and medals of Belgium
Awards established in 1922